Kellenberger is a surname. Notable people with the surname include:

Emil Kellenberger (1864–1943), Swiss sports shooter
Jakob Kellenberger (born 1944), Swiss diplomat

See also
Kellenberger Estate, a historic estate in North Carolina, U.S.